Events from the year 1903 in Denmark.

Incumbents
 Monarch – Christian IX
 Prime minister – Johan Henrik Deuntzer

Events

 2 March – A Social Democrat is elected as lord mayor in Copenhagen for the first time.
 18 April The local government of Saint Croix in the Danish West Indies issues a provisional Ordinance concerning measures against Glanders in St. Croix

Undated
 The cakewalk reaches Copenhagen.
 Motor ferries start to operate in the Port of Copenhagen.

Sports
 2 May  Boldklubben 1903 is founded.
 16–22 August  The 1903 UCI Track Cycling World Championships are held in Copenhagen.
 Thorvald Ellegaard wins gold in men's sprint for the third year in a eeow.

Births
 21 April – Hans Hedtoft, politician, former prime minister (died 1953)
 23 June – Hans Christian Branner, writer (died 1966)
 30 July – Anna Borg, Danish-Icelandic actress (died 1963)

Deaths
 12 March – Vilhelm Kyhn, painter and educator (born 1819)
 12 October – Erhard Frederiksen, agriculturalist (born 1843)
 11 December – Heinrich Tønnies, photographer (born 1825)

References

 
Denmark
Years of the 20th century in Denmark
1900s in Denmark
Denmark